Carmelo Héctor Giuliano González (born June 14, 1951), is a former Argentine football defender. He was born in Avellaneda and played for Hércules CF.

Club career
When Club Atlético Independiente won the 1973 Intercontinental Cup, Giuliano was a substitute in the final. He joined Hércules on the recommendation of Miguel Ángel Santoro. He was one of the players with most appearances in Hércules in La Liga. Although one of the most famous defenders of the La Liga, he was never in the national team. He retired after 30 years after an incident in a Copa del Rey match against Cartagena FC in 1980, during which he was injured by another player Pedro Arango Segura. After his enforced retirement to Alicante where he currently lives, he became a sports commentator on radio and television.

Honours
Independiente
Copa Interamericana: 1972
Intercontinental Cup: 1973

References

External links
 

Living people
1951 births
Sportspeople from Avellaneda
Association football defenders
Argentine footballers
Club Atlético Independiente footballers
Club Atlético Atlanta footballers
Argentine expatriate footballers
Expatriate footballers in Spain
La Liga players
Segunda División players
Hércules CF players
Naturalised citizens of Spain